Mary Girl is a 1917 British silent drama film directed by Maurice Elvey and starring Norman McKinnel, Jessie Winter and Margaret Bannerman.

Cast
 Norman McKinnel as Ezra
 Jessie Winter as Mary
 Margaret Bannerman as Countess Folkington
 Edward O'Neill as George Latimer
 Marsh Allen

References

External links

1917 films
1917 drama films
British silent feature films
1910s English-language films
Films directed by Maurice Elvey
British drama films
British black-and-white films
1910s British films
Silent drama films